Bruchmühlen is a railway station located in Bruchmühlen, a part of Melle, Germany. The station is located on the Löhne-Rheine railway. The train services are operated by WestfalenBahn.

Train services
The station is served by the following services:

Local services  Hengelo - Bad Bentheim - Rheine - Osnabrück - Herford - Bielefeld

Notes 

Railway stations in Lower Saxony